Manuel José Macário do Nascimento Clemente, GCC (born 16 July 1948), officially Manuel III, is a Portuguese prelate of the Catholic Church. He has been the Metropolitan Patriarch of Lisbon since 18 May 2013 and a cardinal since 14 February 2015. He has been a bishop since 1999 and was Bishop of Porto from 2007 to 2013.

Biography and education
Manuel was born on 16 July 1948 at Torres Vedras, Portugal, to Francisco de Nascimento Clemente and Maria Sofia Correia Lopes Macário.  He entered the Major Seminary of Christ the King of the Groves in 1973 and graduated from the University of Lisbon a year later with a degree in history. He also received a degree in theology in 1979 at the Catholic University of Portugal where he taught Church History beginning in 1975. He also received a Doctorate in Historical Theology with his thesis titled "On the origins of contemporary apostolate in Portugal: The "Catholic Society" (1843–1853)".

Priest
Manuel was ordained a priest on 29 June 1979 by Patriarch of Lisbon, António Ribeiro at the age of 31. From then on, he attained several positions. He became the director of Center for the Study of Religious History from 2000-2007. he became the member of the Scientific Society of the Catholic University since 1993 and became  Associate Academic Correspondent of the Portuguese Academy of History from 1996. Manuel also became the head of the Foundation for Science and Technology's projects:  Church and social movements: Catholic organizations in Portugal in the twentieth century (1993–1995) and The Catholic movement and the presence Church in Portuguese society (1996–1998).

When Manuel was ordained, he was assigned as parochial vicar of Runa in Torres Vedras. In 1989 he was appointed canon of the Lisbon Cathedral and the vice-rector of the Major Seminary of Christ the King Of The Groves until 1997, when he was appointed as president. He was the Coordinator of the Patriarchate in 1996 and coordinator of the Preparatory Commission of the Presbytery Assembly for Jubilee 2000. He is the author of a vast work of historiography, especially titles like Portugal and the Portuguese and a single purpose published in 2009 and Portuguese Church and Society, the Republic of Liberalism.

Bishop

Auxiliary Bishop of Lisbon
He was appointed auxiliary bishop of Lisbon with the title of Titular Bishop of Pinhel on 6 November 1999 by Pope John Paul II. His episcopal consecration took place on 22 January 2000 in the Church of the Jeronimos Monastery with Patriarch José Policarpo as principal consecrator with Bishops Manuel Franco da Costa de Oliveira Falcão and Albino Mamede Cleto as co-consecrators. At his consecration he chose his current episcopal motto: In Lumine tuo (In Your Light) .

He was named Promoter of Pastoral Culture in the Portuguese Episcopal Conference in 2002 and he was also the president of the Episcopal Commission of Culture, Cultural and Communications from 2005 to 2011. He is a recognized figure in Portuguese culture and contributes to the Cultural Ministry in Portugal. Manuel is an excellent communicator and is highly respected by the intellectual circles inside and outside the Church. For many years, he has worked regularly and collaborated with various media outlets.

Bishop of Porto
Manuel was appointed bishop of Porto on 22 February 2007 by Pope Benedict XVI, succeeding Armindo Lopes Coelho. He was installed on 25 March. In 2008 he was the first Portuguese bishop to convey the Christmas Address through YouTube. In 2011 he was elected vice-president of the Portuguese Episcopal Conference and was appointed to the Pontifical Council for Social Communications.

Metropolitan Patriarch of Lisbon
Manuel was appointed Metropolitan Patriarch of Lisbon on 18 May 2013 when Pope Francis accepted the resignation of José Policarpo. He was enthroned on 6 July 2013 at the Lisbon Cathedral and made his solemn entry to the Jerónimos Monastery the following day. In a farewell statement to the diocese of Porto,  Manuel makes sure that "the heart has no distance, only depth plus". Because the Patriarch of Lisbon is the Metropolitan of the Ecclesiastical Province of Lisbon, Manuel received the pallium in a ceremony at St. Peter's Basilica on 29 June.

The Portuguese Episcopal Conference elected him president in 2013 and re-elected him to a three-year term in 2014.

Cardinal
Pope Clement XII, by the Bull Inter praecipuas apostolici ministerii dated February 17, 1737, established that the person appointed Patriarch of Lisbon would be elevated to the rank of cardinal in the following consistory. Pope Francis disregarded this and did not make Manuel a cardinal in 2014 but on February 14, 2015 in the second consistory following his appointment as metropolitan patriarch.

In a message left on the website of the Presidency of the Portuguese Republic, President Cavaco Silva congratulated Manuel "by this proof of distinction and appreciation of His Holiness Pope Francis." The selection of the bishop of Porto for the position of Patriarch of Lisbon represented, he wrote, "recognition of the route as servant of the Church and illustrious academic, as man of culture and exemplary citizen." "Portuguese society, which he knows so well, recalls his lucid and moderate interventions, and the deep sense of his social and humanistic action, attributes which are so relevant as the country faces these demanding times," he added. The Foreign Ministry welcomed the appointment with "the warm enthusiasm deserving of the personality of the current Bishop of Porto." "D. Manuel Clemente is recognized as a man of faith, culture and social sensitivity."

On 4 January 2015, Pope Francis announced that he would make him a cardinal on 14 February. At that ceremony, he was assigned the titular church of Sant'Antonio in Campo Marzio.

On 13 April 2015 he was appointed a member of the Congregation for the Clergy and the Pontifical Council for Social Communications.

Papers published

Honours

Portuguese 
 Grand-Cross of the Order of Christ , Portugal (30 August 2010)

Municipal 

 Medal of Honor, Marco de Canaveses (15 October 2010) 
 Medal of Honor, Valongo (14 January 2011) 
 Medal of Honor and Citizen of Porto, Porto (25 April 2011) 
 Gold Medal of Honor, Gondomar (27 January 2012)
 Key of Honor, Melres (24 February 2012) 
 Medal of Honor and Honorary Citizen, Vila Nova de Gaia (24 April 2013)

Academic 

 Doctor Honoris Causa in Political Science and International Relations Citizenship by the Lusophone University of Porto, 18 May 2012

Others 

 2009 Pessoa Prize for being "an ethical reference for Portuguese society as a whole"

Foreign 

 Grand-Cross of the Order pro merito Melitensi (12 December 2012)

See also
Cardinals created by Pope Francis

References

External links
 . Holy See Press Office.
  . Diocese de Porto.
  . Patriarchy of Lisbon.

1948 births
Living people
Bishops of Porto
21st-century Portuguese cardinals
Cardinals created by Pope Francis
People from Torres Vedras
Patriarchs of Lisbon
Pessoa Prize winners
University of Lisbon alumni
Members of the Congregation for the Clergy
Members of the Pontifical Council for Social Communications
Members of the Order of the Holy Sepulchre
Recipients of the Order pro Merito Melitensi
21st-century Roman Catholic archbishops in Portugal